= Natu Nagar =

Village in Maharashtra

- Village
- Interactive map of Natu Nagar
- Country: India
- State: Maharashtra

Natu Nagar is a small village in Ratnagiri district, Maharashtra state in Western India. The 2011 Census of India recorded a total of 602 residents in the village. Natu Nagar's geographical area is approximately 88 hectares (220 acres).
